Ronnie C. Crudup Jr. (born June 12, 1977) is an American politician, activist, and pastor serving as a member of the Mississippi House of Representatives. He assumed office on March 18, 2019.

Education 
Crudup graduated from Murrah High School and earned a Bachelor of Science degree in history from Belhaven University.

Career 
From 2006 to 2011, Crudup worked as an executive assistant at New Horizon Church International. He has been the executive director of New Horizon Ministries Inc. since July 2011. Crudup was a Democratic candidate in the 2017 Jackson mayoral election, placing fifth in a field of nine candidates. Crudup was elected to the Mississippi House of Representatives in a 2019 special election.

References 

1977 births
Living people
Democratic Party members of the Mississippi House of Representatives
Belhaven University alumni
African-American state legislators in Mississippi
Politicians from Jackson, Mississippi
21st-century American politicians
21st-century African-American politicians
20th-century African-American people